Scarborough Centre is a rapid transit station and bus terminal in Toronto, Ontario, Canada, serving Line 3 Scarborough of the Toronto subway system and multiple bus routes of the Toronto Transit Commission (TTC). It is located north of Ellesmere Road between Brimley and McCowan Roads, just south of Highway 401. It is adjacent to the Scarborough Centre Bus Terminal, which is a station for GO Transit buses and other intercity coach services.

In February 2021, the TTC recommended the closure of Line 3 in 2023 and its replacement by bus service until the completion of the Scarborough extension of Line 2 Bloor–Danforth. After the closure of this station, a new Scarborough Centre station would be built along the planned Line 2 extension east of the existing station.

History
Scarborough Centre station was opened in 1985 along with the rest of Line 3. The station replaced transit access to the Scarborough Town Centre shopping mall's south side (at ground level along roadway).

In 2000, this station became accessible with elevators.

The 985A Sheppard East Express bus currently links the two stations, making limited stops along Sheppard Avenue. In March 2007, however, the TTC dropped this plan when it announced its Transit City proposal to build the Sheppard East LRT. The LRT proposal was later replaced by a plan to extend Line 4 eastwards from Don Mills station to McCowan Road.

Around 2011, there was a proposal to convert Line 3 to light-rail with an extension of the Eglinton Crosstown line (Line 5 Eglinton) over the Line 3 right-of-way.

In 2013, the proposal was changed to abandon the Line 3 right-of-way and build an underground extension of Line 2 Bloor–Danforth along McCowan Road. This would result in the decommissioning of all Line 3 stations beyond Kennedy station. A new Scarborough Centre station would be built east of the current station and would be oriented on a north–south alignment rather than the east–west alignment of the current station. Between 2013 and 2016, the new Scarborough Centre station was planned as a through-station. In order to save money for another transit project, the plan was revised in 2016 to make it a terminal station. However, in 2019 the plan was revised again to make the new Scarborough Centre station a through-station.

Station description

Existing station

The existing station is located north of Ellesmere Road, between Brimley and McCowan Roads; the station is elevated and oriented east–west to the south of the Scarborough Town Centre. The station is built on three levels: Line 3 is on the upper level, the mezzanine, and passenger entry from the mall and an automatic entrance from Brian Harrison Way is on the middle level (also where fares are paid to enter the station), and the bus terminal and an automatic entrance from the Scarborough Centre Bus Terminal are at ground level. There is elevator access for all the TTC services, making this station fully accessible to anyone with disabilities.

East of the current station, the Line 3 tracks continue travelling east on an elevated bridge until they reach McCowan station. West of the station, the tracks are on an elevated bridge which begins to descend after passing over Brimley Road. It continues to descend until it reaches Midland station.

The TTC plans to decommission the Line 3 portion of the existing station in 2023; however, the adjacent bus facilities will be kept in operation until 2030 with its bus bays reconfigured.

Future station
The provincial transit agency Metrolinx plans to build a new underground Scarborough Centre station parallel to McCowan Road along a planned extension of Line 2 Bloor–Danforth. The new station will be on a north–south alignment to the east of Scarborough Town Centre. The new station will have a new Scarborough Centre Bus Terminal serving TTC and GO Transit buses as well as the Durham Region Transit bus rapid transit line. The new station and bus terminal are expected to open in 2030.

Nearby landmarks
Located in Scarborough City Centre, nearby landmarks include the Scarborough Town Centre shopping mall, Scarborough Civic Centre, Albert Campbell Square, Canada Centre government offices, and Scarborough YMCA.

Surface connections

Toronto Transit Commission 

TTC routes serving the station include:

Other operators

Scarborough Centre station is also home to the Scarborough Centre Bus Terminal which is located directly east of the TTC bus platform. It is served by GO Transit, Megabus (Coach Canada), and TOK Coachlines (formerly Can-ar Coach Service).  

Although the Durham Region Transit (DRT) route does not currently service the bus terminal, it departs at McCowan station at McCowan Road and Triton Road.

References

External links
 
 

Line 3 Scarborough stations
Railway stations in Canada opened in 1985